Microsteira is a genus of flowering plants belonging to the family Malpighiaceae.

Its native range is Madagascar.

Species:

Microsteira ambongensis 
Microsteira ambovombensis 
Microsteira ampihamensis 
Microsteira axillaris 
Microsteira besomatensis 
Microsteira brickavillensis 
Microsteira chorigyna 
Microsteira curtisii 
Microsteira decaryi 
Microsteira diotostigma 
Microsteira eriophylla 
Microsteira firingalavae 
Microsteira floribunda 
Microsteira glabrifolia 
Microsteira glaucifolia 
Microsteira gracilis 
Microsteira grandiflora 
Microsteira humbertii 
Microsteira ivohibensis 
Microsteira macrophylla 
Microsteira microcarpa 
Microsteira paniculata 
Microsteira perrieri 
Microsteira pluriseta 
Microsteira radamae 
Microsteira sclerophylla 
Microsteira tulearensis

References

Malpighiaceae
Malpighiaceae genera